Notocelia is a genus of moths belonging to the subfamily Olethreutinae of the family Tortricidae.

Species
Notocelia albosectana (Mabille, 1900)
Notocelia aritai Kawabe, 1989
Notocelia autolitha (Meyrick, 1931)
Notocelia culminana (Walsingham, 1879)
Notocelia cycloides Diakonoff, 1989
Notocelia cynosbatella (Linnaeus, 1758)
Notocelia donaldana Kawabe, 1993
Notocelia illotana (Walsingham, 1879)
Notocelia incarnatana (Hübner, [1796-1799])
Notocelia kurosawai Kawabe, 1986
Notocelia mediterranea (Obratzsov, 1952)
Notocelia nigripunctata Kuznetzov, 1973
Notocelia nimia Falkovitsh, 1965
Notocelia nobilis Kuznetzov, 1973
Notocelia plumbea Nasu, 1980
Notocelia punicana Kuznetzov, 1956
Notocelia roborana (Denis & Schiffermuller, 1775)
Notocelia purpurissatana (Heinrich, 1923)
Notocelia rosaecolana (Doubleday, 1850)
Notocelia scotodes Bradley, 1965
Notocelia tetragonana (Stephens, 1834)
Notocelia trimaculana (Haworth, [1811])
Notocelia uddmanniana (Linnaeus, 1758)
Notocelia yakushimensis Kawabe, 1974
Notocelia zelota (Meyrick, 1916)

See also
List of Tortricidae genera

References

External links
tortricidae.com

Eucosmini
Tortricidae genera
Taxa named by Jacob Hübner